Jesús Daniel Hernández Casiano (born 1 August 2001) is a Mexican professional footballer who plays as an attacking midfielder for Liga MX club Pachuca.

Career statistics

Club

Honours
Pachuca
Liga MX: Apertura 2022

References

External links
 
 
 

2001 births
Living people
Mexican footballers
Association football midfielders
Liga MX players
C.F. Pachuca players
Footballers from Guerrero